was a Japanese poet, calligrapher and historian.

Biography
Yaichi was born in the Furumachi area of Niigata, Niigata, and was a professor emeritus of ancient Chinese and Japanese art at Waseda University. His focus was mostly on Buddhist art of the Asuka and Nara eras.

In 1926 he advocated for the creation of an art history museum at Waseda University, and eventually collected a vast number of works. In 1951 he received the 2nd Yomiuri Prize.

External links

http://www.waseda.jp/aizu/

References

1881 births
1956 deaths
People from Niigata (city)
Yomiuri Prize winners
20th-century Japanese poets
Buddhist artists